Julio Baumann (born 29 January 1998) is a Chilean handball player for the Chilean national team.

He represented Chile at the 2019 World Men's Handball Championship.

References

1998 births
Living people
Chilean male handball players
20th-century Chilean people
21st-century Chilean people